Jarretts Ford is an unincorporated community in Kanawha County, West Virginia, United States.

The community was named for a ford located near Eli Jarrett's property.

References 

Unincorporated communities in West Virginia
Unincorporated communities in Kanawha County, West Virginia